Perry Ledge is a reef west of Ringstead in Dorset, England.

The ledge consists of limestone dating from the Jurassic period and is exposed at low tide. It is located close to Bran Point.

References 

Reefs of the Atlantic Ocean
Landforms of Dorset
Geology of Dorset
Jurassic Coast
Reefs of England